Strigamia crassipes is a centipede belonging to the family Linotaeniidae in the order Geophilomorpha.

Description
Strigamia crassipes is red in colour and has a prominent tooth at the base of the poison claw. Males of this species have 47 to 55 pairs of legs; females have 47 to 57. The number of legs distinguishes this species from S. acuminata (which has only 37 to 41 leg pairs in males and 39 to 43 leg pairs in females). The specific name crassipes is Latin for "thick leg."

It produces a bioluminescent substance in its sternal glands and secretes it through the sternal pore fields; it is yellow or blue in colour.

Habitat
Strigamia crassipes lives in woodland habitats in Ireland, southern England and Wales, and elsewhere in Europe.

References

Myriapods of Europe
Animals described in 1835
Geophilomorpha
Taxa named by Carl Ludwig Koch